Football Club Montceau Bourgogne is a French association football team founded in 1948. They are based in Montceau-les-Mines, Bourgogne, France and are currently playing in the Championnat National 3. They play at the Stade des Alouettes in Montceau-les-Mines, which has a capacity of 6,000.

Coupe de France 2006–07
In the quarterfinals of the 2007 Coupe de France, 4th division Montceau made the headlines by defeating Lens 1–0, who were at that time sitting in 2nd place in Ligue 1. In the same season, Montceau also defeated Bordeaux, another Ligue 1 side. Eventually, the team fell in the semi-finals against Sochaux (2–0).

Current squad

References

External links
FC Montceau Bourgogne official website

1948 establishments in France
Association football clubs established in 1948
Sport in Saône-et-Loire
Football clubs in Bourgogne-Franche-Comté